Kimsen is an Estonian surname. Notable people with the surname include:

 Kadri Kimsen (born 1976), Estonian footballer
 Kaire Kimsen (born 1978), Estonian footballer, sister of Kadri

See also
Kimsey

Estonian-language surnames